Tomopleura vertebrata is a species of sea snail, a marine gastropod mollusk in the family Borsoniidae.

Description
The length of the shell attains 20 mm.

Distribution
This marine species occurs off South Africa, in the Persian Gulf and off Japan

References

 R.N. Kilburn (1986), Turridae (Mollusca: Gastropoda) of southern Africa and Mozambique. Part 3. Subfamily Borsoniinae; Ann. Natal Mus. Vol. 27(2) pp. 633–720

External links
 

vertebrata
Gastropods described in 1875